Kaniyar is a caste from the Indian state of Kerala. There are regional variations in the name used to define them. They are listed under the Other Backward Communities (OBC) by the Kerala Government.

Traditions of origin
Kathleen Gough has recorded that the caste believes that they descended from a degraded section of the Tamil Brahmins and that they ascribed their "rudimentary" knowledge of Sanskrit, medicine and astrology to those origins.

Traditional occupations
Gough says that the caste in many ways played the role of 

It was the Kaniyars who decorate the elaborate costumes. of the dance conducted at various temples in central Travancore. They were also famous in the field of ayurveda treatment (Traditional Indian medical stream) across Kerala. Kaniyar panickers are famous with astrology even now in Northern Kerala.

The Kaniyar were also once teachers, primarily in village schools. The arrival of the British in the area saw the demise of traditional teaching, with Sanskrit teaching being deprecated in favor of its English counterpart, disruption due to various wars and also a discouragement of the village schools in general. The standard of literacy declined greatly for nearly a century and began to improve once more with the advent of state aid for (principally English-based) education at the end of the 19th century.

Aside from general teaching,they also taught fencing to the Izhava and Thiyyar caste.  Gurukkal is another name used for the northern group because of their involvement with these schools. They asserted that because of this they were superior to the Asan members of the caste, who were primarily to be found in southern Travancore.

Notable people 
 Niranam Poets – Madhava Panikkar, Sankara Panikkar, and Rama Panikkar Authoers of Kannassa Ramayanam.

References

Social groups of Kerala
Social groups of Karnataka
Kerala society
Indian castes